Walnut Cove Colored School, also known as London School, is historic Rosenwald School located at Walnut Cove, Stokes County, North Carolina. It was built in 1921 with a grant from Sears & Roebuck financier, Julius Rosenwald.  A condition of the grant was that it had to have local matching funds. Therefore, it was built on land donated by John William Dalton and his brother George Samuel Dalton and with materials provided by The Dan River Lumber Company.

It is a one-story, rectangular frame building with five classrooms and Bungalow / American Craftsman design elements.  It has weatherboard siding, a broad clipped gable roof, large sash windows, and a projecting front vestibule.  The building measures approximately 49 feet wide by 73 feet deep and rests on a brick foundation.  It housed a school until 1952. It was later renovated for use as a senior citizens' community center.

It was added to the National Register of Historic Places in 1995.

References

Rosenwald schools in North Carolina
School buildings on the National Register of Historic Places in North Carolina
School buildings completed in 1921
Schools in Stokes County, North Carolina
National Register of Historic Places in Stokes County, North Carolina
1921 establishments in North Carolina